The 2007–08 Quaid-e-Azam Trophy was one of two first-class domestic cricket competitions that were held in Pakistan during the 2007–08 season. It was the 50th edition of the Quaid-e-Azam Trophy, contested by 22 teams representing regional cricket associations and departments, and was followed in the schedule by the Pentangular Cup, contested by five teams representing the four provinces and the federal areas.

There were substantial changes from the previous season, with the regions and departments being merged into a single competition by the Pakistan Cricket Board. The previous four (and 15 of the preceding 17) seasons had seen them compete in separate competitions, regions in the Quaid-e-Azam Trophy and departments in the Patron's Trophy. The 22 teams, thirteen regions and nine departments, were divided into two groups; four-day matches in the group stage were played in a round-robin between 20 October and 29 December 2007, with the top team in each group contesting the five-day final from 7 to 11 January 2008 to determine the winner.

The final round of group matches were disrupted by the assassination of Benazir Bhutto, former prime minister of Pakistan. All in-progress matches were suspended and after initially indicating that they would be resumed or replayed, the Pakistan Cricket Board later decided that the results would stand.

Sui Northern Gas Pipelines Limited (SNGPL) won the Quaid-e-Azam Trophy for the first time by defeating Habib Bank Limited in the final; the match resulted in a draw, with SNGPL emerging victorious by virtue of securing a first-innings lead.

Group stage
The top teams in the round-robin group stage (highlighted) advanced to the final.

Final

Notes

References

External links
 Series home at ESPN Cricinfo

Domestic cricket competitions in 2007–08
2007 in Pakistani cricket
2008 in Pakistani cricket
Pakistani cricket seasons from 2000–01
2007–08 Quaid-e-Azam Trophy